Illy is an Italian coffee company.

Illy may also refer to:
 Illy, Ardennes, commune in the Ardennes department in northern France
 Andrea Illy, Italian businessman
 Illy (rapper), Australian hip hop artist from Melbourne, Victoria